Hog Island is the historic name of an area southeast of Tinicum Township, Pennsylvania along the Delaware River, to the west of the mouth of the Schuylkill River. Philadelphia International Airport now sits on the land that was once Hog Island.

History
European settlers purchased Hog Island from the Lenape (Delaware) tribe in 1680.  The settlers gradually developed the island by building log and earthwork dikes to minimize storm damage and convert the marshes into good grazing meadows. Hog Island supposedly got its name from the pigs which local residents left to roam free, as no fencing was needed.

In 1917, as part of the World War I effort, the US government contracted American International Shipbuilding Corp. to build ships and a shipyard at Hog Island.  At the time, Hog Island was the largest shipyard in the world, with 50 slipways.  

In 1918, a 4.5-mile (7.2 km) rail line was built to connect Hog Island with Philadelphia, Pennsylvania: the 60th Street Branch of the Pennsylvania Railroad.

The first ship (named  for the Lenape name for the site) was christened August 5, 1918, by Edith Bolling Wilson, wife of U.S. President Woodrow Wilson.  The shipbuilding process practiced on Hog Island was an early experiment in standardized construction of ships.  The ships built there, known as "Hog Islanders", were considered ugly but well-built.  In all, 122 Hog Islanders were built, mostly cargo ships, and a few troop transport ships.  The shipbuilding continued until 1921, after which the facility was rapidly demolished.  None of the ships were ready in time to participate in World War I, but many of them were involved in World War II.  Two of the locomotive steam gantry cranes were sold as surplus to the city of Trenton, New Jersey, where they remain today as the Hog Island Cranes, listed on the National Register of Historic Places. Another crane, a 20-ton industrial locomotive crane, was sold to the Hyde, McFarlan & Burke contracting company.

The U.S. Army Corps of Engineers filled in the creek separating Hog Island from the mainland with silt dredged from the shipping channels, making Hog Island part of the mainland. 

Air operations began on Hog Island in 1925, when the Pennsylvania Air National Guard used a small part of it as a training field for its pilots. In 1927, the site was dedicated as the "Philadelphia Municipal Airport" by Charles Lindbergh, who flew in on the Spirit of Saint Louis. But more than a decade would pass before the airport would become the region's main air hub. The city of Philadelphia bought Hog Island from the federal government in 1930 for $3 million but the Great Depression delayed work until 1937. In the meantime, Camden Central Airport, opened in 1929 in New Jersey, served as the city's main airport until Philadelphia Municipal Airport opened on June 20, 1940.

Cultural context
One legend of the origin of the hoagie sandwich is tied to Hog Island. Domenic Vitiello, professor of Urban Studies at the University of Pennsylvania, asserts that Italians working on Hog Island in the old Navy Yard introduced the sandwich, by putting various meat, cheese, and lettuce between two slices of bread. This became known as the "Hog Island" sandwich; hence, the "hoagie".

See also
 Fort Mifflin
 Hog Islander
 Hog Island Cranes

References

External links 
 List of ships built by the Hog Island Shipyard
 Controversy about the shipbuilding operation 
 Frederick W. Wood papers at Hagley Museum and Library. Wood was vice president of the American International Shipbuilding Corporation and played a major part in the construction and operation of the shipyard at Hog Island.
 "The Saga of Hog Island,1917-1921: The Story of the First Great War Boondoggle", James J. Martin

Neighborhoods in Philadelphia
Southwest Philadelphia
Shipyards of the United States
Philadelphia International Airport